Manuel Piazza (born 13 October 1999) is an Italian pair skater. With his skating partner, Anna Valesi, he has won four senior international medals, including silver at the 2022 Bavarian Open.

Career

Early years 
Piazza began learning to skate in 2006. He placed sixth in junior men's singles at the Italian Championships in December 2016 and again in December 2017.

In 2018, he teamed up with Alyssa Montan to compete in junior pairs. Making their international debut, Montan/Piazza won silver at the Inge Solar Memorial – Alpen Trophy in November 2018. The following month, they took silver in the junior event at the Italian Championships.

In their second and final season together, Montan/Piazza won the Italian national junior title and placed 16th at the 2020 World Junior Championships in Tallinn, Estonia. The two were coached by Ondřej Hotárek, Luca Demattè, and Franca Bianconi in Bergamo, Italy.

2021–22 season 
In the 2021–22 season, Piazza began competing in the senior ranks with Anna Valesi. Making their international debut, Valesi/Piazza took bronze at the Tayside Trophy in November 2021. The following month, they placed fourth at the Italian Championships.

In January 2022, Valesi/Piazza were awarded silver medals at two events – the Icelab International Cup and Bavarian Open.

2022–23 season 
In September 2022, Valesi/Piazza won bronze at the Lombardia Trophy and placed seventh at the 2022 CS Nebelhorn Trophy. In October, they were invited to their first Grand Prix event, the 2022 Skate America, where they finished fifth. They were seventh at the 2022 Grand Prix of Espoo.

Programs

With Valesi

With Montan

Competitive highlights 
GP: Grand Prix; CS: Challenger Series

Pair skating with Valesi

Pair skating with Montan

Single skating

References

External links 
 
 
 

1999 births
Italian male pair skaters
Living people
Sportspeople from Bolzano